The Church of the Virgin Mary’s Immaculate Conception  is a Roman Catholic church in Baku, Azerbaijan. The original church also named Church of the Immaculate Conception operated from 1915 to 1931, when it was ordered destroyed by the Soviet government. 

In 2006, a new Catholic church bearing the same name was rebuilt in a different spot of Baku. On 29 April 2007 the new church was consecrated by Apostolic Nuncio in Transcaucasia Monsignor Claudio Gugerotti.

History
In 1997, the Catholic community of Baku was re-established. In 2000, the Apostolic Prefecture of Azerbaijan was created. After Pope John Paul II's visit to Azerbaijan in 2002, it was granted land to build a new church. The cornerstone of the new church was blessed by John Paul II. The new Church of the Virgin Mary’s Immaculate Conception was built in 2006, in a different spot of Baku according to the Italian architect Paolo Ruggiero's project. The style of the building will be New Gothic and will in some ways recall the facade of the original church. The church was designed to have a pastoral center and a residency for priests. The statue of the Virgin Mary by local sculptors was set up over the entrance of the Church which has 200 benches. The church bells were a present from Lech Kaczyński, then President of Poland. On 29 April 2007 the Apostolic Nuncio in Transcaucasia Monsignor Claudio Gugerotti administered the rite of consecration of the Church. The church was then also dedicated on Sunday, March 7th, 2008 by Cardinal Tarcisio Bertone.

See also
Roman Catholic Marian churches
Roman Catholicism in Azerbaijan

References

External links
Catholic Church in Azerbaijan, Retrieved 2014-04-23

Roman Catholic churches completed in 2006
21st-century Roman Catholic church buildings
Roman Catholic churches in Azerbaijan
Churches in Baku